Camaricus is a genus of crab spiders that was first described by Tamerlan Thorell in 1887.

Species
 it contains fifteen species, found in Africa, Asia, and on New Caledonia:
Camaricus bipunctatus Bastawade, 2002 – India
Camaricus castaneiceps Berland, 1924 – New Caledonia
Camaricus chayani Biswas & Raychaudhuri, 2017 – Bangladesh
Camaricus cimex (Karsch, 1878) – East Africa
Camaricus florae Barrion & Litsinger, 1995 – Philippines
Camaricus formosus Thorell, 1887 – India to Indonesia (Sumatra), China, Philippines
Camaricus hastifer (Percheron, 1833) – Unknown
Camaricus khandalaensis Tikader, 1980 – India
Camaricus maugei (Walckenaer, 1837) (type) – India to Vietnam, Indonesia (Sumatra, Java, Krakatau)
Camaricus mimus (Pavesi, 1895) – Ethiopia, East Africa
Camaricus nigrotesselatus Simon, 1895 – Central, East, South Africa
Camaricus parisukatus Barrion & Litsinger, 1995 – Philippines
Camaricus pulchellus Simon, 1903 – Vietnam
Camaricus rinkae Biswas & Roy, 2005 – India
Camaricus siltorsus Saha & Raychaudhuri, 2007 – India

Nomen dubium
C. nigrotesselatus Strand, 1907

See also
 List of Thomisidae species

References

Further reading

Thomisidae
Thomisidae genera
Spiders of Africa
Spiders of Asia
Taxa named by Tamerlan Thorell